Josep Picó Lladó (born April 12, 1964 in Sabadell, Catalonia) is a former water polo player from Spain, who was a member of the national team that won the silver medal near his home town, at the 1992 Summer Olympics in Barcelona, Spain.

See also
 List of Olympic medalists in water polo (men)
 List of World Aquatics Championships medalists in water polo

References
 Spanish Olympic Committee

External links
 

1964 births
Living people
Water polo players from Catalonia
Spanish male water polo players
Sportsmen from Catalonia
Water polo players at the 1992 Summer Olympics
Olympic silver medalists for Spain in water polo
Sportspeople from Sabadell
Medalists at the 1992 Summer Olympics